Cyana marshalli is a moth of the family Erebidae. It was described by George Hampson in 1900. It is found in South Africa.

References

Endemic moths of South Africa
Cyana
Moths described in 1900